Cham Sharu (also Romanized as Cham Sharū; also known as Cham Shahrū) is a village in Bahmai-ye Garmsiri-ye Jonubi Rural District, in the Central District of Bahmai County, Kohgiluyeh and Boyer-Ahmad Province, Iran. At the 2006 census, its population was 55, in 9 families.

References 

Populated places in Bahmai County